The 1978 African Cup of Nations was the eleventh edition of the Africa Cup of Nations, the football championship of Africa (CAF). It was hosted by Accra and Kumasi, Ghana. The format of the competition changed from 1976: the field of eight teams was still split into two groups of four, but the final group stage was eliminated in favor of the knockout semifinals used in tournaments prior to 1976 (except 1959). Ghana won its third championship, beating Uganda in the final 2−0.

Ivory Coast and Mali were both disqualified in the second round of qualification: Ivory Coast for using an ineligible player, and Mali after stadium security and police assaulted match officials during the first leg. Since Mali had received a first round walkover after Niger failed to appear, Upper Volta, who had been beaten by the Ivory Coast in the first round, were given their place in the final tournament.

Qualified teams 

The 8 qualified teams are:

 
  (host)
  (holders)
 
 
 
 1
 

1 Ivory Coast originally qualified by beating Mali 2–1 on aggregate, but both teams were disqualified: Ivory Coast for fielding an ineligible player in the second leg, and Mali due to police and stadium security assaulting the match officials during the first leg. Upper Volta, who had lost to Ivory Coast in the previous round, were given their place in the finals.

Squads

Venues 
The competition was played in two venues in Accra and Kumasi.

Group stage 
 Teams highlighted in green progress to the quarterfinals
 2 points awarded for a win and 1 point for a draw at group stage

Group A

Group B

Knockout stage

Semi-finals

Third place match 

1 The match was abandoned after Tunisia walked off in the 42nd minute with the score tied at 1–1 to protest the officiating. Nigeria were awarded a 2–0 win, and Tunisia were suspended for two years (also banning them from the next tournament).

Final

Scorers 
 The two scorers in the third place match not added.
3 goals

  Opoku Afriyie
  Segun Odegbami
  Phillip Omondi

2 goals

  Karim Abdul Razak
  George Alhassan
  Hassan "Acila" Amcharrat
  Abderraouf Ben Aziza
  Godfrey Kisitu

 1 goal

  Jacques Mamounoubala
  Willie Klutse
  Akid
  Mohammed "Polo" Ahmed
  Adokiye Amiesimaka
  Christian Chukwu
  Martins Eyo
  Ali Kaabi
  Mohsen Labidi
  Samuel Musenze
  Abdulla Nasur
  Moses Nsereko
  Edward Semwanga
  Hubert Hien
  Mamadaou Koïta
  Obby Kapita
  Bizwell Phiri
  Patrick Phiri
  Baba Otu Mohammed

CAF Team of the Tournament 

Goalkeeper
  Mohammed Al-Hazaz

Defenders
  Mokhtar Dhouieb
  James Kuuku Dadzie
  Khaled Gasmi
  Larbi Ihardane

Midfielders
  Moses Nsereko
  Karim Abdul Razak
  Adolf Armah
  Phillip Omondi

Forwards
  Segun Odegbami
  Mohammed Polo

References

External links 
 Rec.Sport.Soccer Statistics Foundation (RSSSF)
 footballmundial.tripod.com

 
International association football competitions hosted by Ghana
Africa Cup of Nations tournaments
African Cup of Nations, 1978
Sport in Accra
Nations, 1978
African Cup of Nations